This is a list of poppy seed pastries and dishes. Poppy seed is an oilseed obtained from the opium poppy (Papaver somniferum).  The tiny kidney-shaped seeds have been harvested from dried seed pods by various civilizations for thousands of years.  The seeds are used, whole or ground, as an ingredient in many foods, and they are pressed to yield poppyseed oil. Poppy seeds are less than a millimeter in length, and minute: it takes 3,300 poppy seeds to make up a gram, and a pound contains between 1 and 2 million seeds. The primary flavor compound is 2-Pentylfuran.

Poppy seed pastries and dishes

See also

 List of pastries
 List of desserts
 List of sesame seed dishes

References

External links
 

Lists of foods by ingredient
List
Poppy seed